Zafer Görgen (born 21 June 2000) is a Turkish footballer who plays as a goalkeeper for Çaykur Rizespor.

Professional career
On 31 January 2019, signed a professional contract with Çaykur Rizespor for 4.5 years. On 9 November 2019, Görgen made his professional debut with Rizespor in a 1-0 Süper Lig win over Antalyaspor on 9 November 2019.

References

External links
 TFF Profile
 Soccerway Profile

2000 births
Living people
Sportspeople from Muğla
Turkish footballers
Çaykur Rizespor footballers
Manisaspor footballers
Süper Lig players
TFF First League players
TFF Second League players
Association football goalkeepers